Jack Dixon (born 13 December 1994) is a Welsh rugby union player who plays for Dragons regional team having previously played for Bedwas RFC and Newport RFC. A centre, he made his debut for Newport Gwent Dragons in October 2011 versus Wasps in the Anglo-Welsh Cup as a second-half replacement aged 16 years and 313 days. In doing so, Dixon broke the record for the youngest player to play Welsh regional rugby held by Hallam Amos who set the record earlier in the same match.

Dixon made his debut for the Wales Under-20 team on 9 March 2012 versus Italy. In April 2012 he was named in the Wales Under-20 squad for the Junior World Cup in South Africa.

In January 2013 he was selected in the Wales Under 20 squad for the 2013 Under 20 Six Nations Championship.

References

External links 
 Dragons profile

1994 births
Living people
Bedwas RFC players
Dragons RFC players
Newport RFC players
Rugby union players from Newbridge, Caerphilly
Welsh rugby union players
Rugby union centres